Anelaphus martinsi is a species of beetle in the family Cerambycidae. It was described by Monne in 2006.

References

Anelaphus
Beetles described in 2006